Danków Castle - a fifteenth-century fortress, composed of bastions safeguarding a now non-existent Gothic-Renaissance castle ground.

References

Castles in Silesian Voivodeship